Svárov is name of several locations in the Czech Republic:
Svárov (Kladno District)
Svárov (Uherské Hradiště District)